Juuso Amuaalua (Hamalwa) Ngaikukwete (born ca. 1873 in Oukwanyama, Ovamboland, Namibia — died 17 June 1955) was one of the first seven Ovambo pastors, whom the director of the Finnish Missionary Society, Matti Tarkkanen ordained into priesthood in Oniipa, Ovamboland, on 27 September 1925, with a permission granted by the Bishop of Tampere, Jaakko Gummerus.

Ngaikukwete was the son of Ngaikukwete yaShimupeni and Mwalungilange yUugwanga. He was baptized on 31 December 1893 by the German missionary Friedrich Meisenholl in Oukwanyama. Ngaikukwete went to school in Oniipa during 1918–20 and to the Oniipa seminary during 1922–25. He worked in Oshitayi during 1925–34 and in Oshigambo during 1934–55.

Ngaikukwete was married to Mwaalwa Maria gaShelungu (b. 1899) and they had one son and three daughters.

References

Sources

Namibian Lutheran clergy
Finnish Evangelical Lutheran Mission